Karabucak Forest is a forest plantation in Turkey

Geography 
The forest is at the south of Tarsus city in Mersin Province. There are two sections in the forest. In the older section called  Güresin forest  Eucalyptus (Eucalyptus camaldulensis) has been planted
  and in the newer section called Turan Emeksiz, stone pine (Pinus pinea) and maritime pine (Pinus pinaster) have been planted  along with a few other species (Güresin was the surname of Fehmi Güresin, the engineer in charge of the project back in 1939 and Turan Emeksiz was the name of a forestry engineering student killed in 1960.)

History 
During the ancient ages, Tarsus was a Mediterranean Sea port. But because of alluvial deposits from the Berdan River the coastline was continuously moving to south. By the 6th century, the coastline had already been moved away and a small lagoon named Rhegma had been formed which obstructed the river flow in the rainy seasons and caused floods. Byzantine Emperor Justinian I (reigned 527-565) had a channel constructed at the east of the city to facilitate easier flow. (present watercourse of the river).  After 7th century the lake was partially dried up and  turned into marshes. But because of the marshes, the number of malaria cases increased sharply. In 1939, the Turkish government (ministry of forestry) started a project to drain the marshes. Eucalyptus  trees were planted on 885 hectare area and the marshes were totally  drained.
In 1960s the forest was further enlarged by covering the coastal band. Pine was preferred in the coastal band.

Karabucak today 
The marsh has been drained  and the sands movement at the coast  has been checked. The forest in addition to being a source of revenue, is now a popular picnic area for Tarsus citizens.

References 

Geography of Mersin Province
Eucalyptus
Forests of Turkey